The 2020 Qatar Total Open was a professional women's tennis tournament played on hard courts. It was the 18th edition of the event and a WTA Premier 5 tournament on the 2020 WTA Tour. It took place at the International Tennis and Squash complex in Doha, Qatar between 23 and 29 February 2020.

Points and prize money

Point distribution

Prize money

*per team

Singles main-draw entrants

Seeds

1 Rankings as of February 17, 2020

Other entrants
The following players received wildcards into the singles main draw:
  Çağla Büyükakçay
  Sorana Cîrstea
  Ons Jabeur
  Vera Zvonareva

The following players received entry using a protected ranking into the singles main draw:
  Yaroslava Shvedova

The following players received entry from the qualifying draw:
  Kirsten Flipkens 
  Priscilla Hon 
  Daria Kasatkina
  Tereza Martincová 
  Bernarda Pera 
  Laura Siegemund 
  Kateřina Siniaková
  Jil Teichmann

The following players received entry as lucky losers:
  Tímea Babos
  Misaki Doi

Withdrawals
Before the tournament
  Bianca Andreescu → replaced by  Jennifer Brady
  Catherine Bellis → replaced by  Polona Hercog
  Danielle Collins → replaced by  Svetlana Kuznetsova
  Simona Halep → replaced by  Misaki Doi
  Angelique Kerber → replaced by  Carla Suárez Navarro
  Johanna Konta → replaced by  Ajla Tomljanović
  Anastasia Pavlyuchenkova → replaced by  Tímea Babos

During the tournament
  Amanda Anisimova (gastrointestinal illness)
  Elena Rybakina (left leg injury)

Doubles main-draw entrants

Seeds 

 Rankings are as of February 17, 2020.

Other entrants
The following pairs received wildcards into the doubles main draw:
  Çağla Büyükakçay /  Laura Siegemund
  Caroline Garcia /  Sania Mirza
  Alla Kudryavtseva /  Katarina Srebotnik

Withdrawals
During the tournament
  Latisha Chan (dizziness)

Champions

Singles

  Aryna Sabalenka def.  Petra Kvitová, 6–3, 6–3

Doubles

  Hsieh Su-wei /  Barbora Strýcová def.  Gabriela Dabrowski /  Jeļena Ostapenko, 6–2, 5–7, [10–2]

References

External links
 

Qatar Total Open
Qatar Ladies Open
2020 in Qatari sport
Qatar Total Open